An Abhyasi is a spiritual seeker in the esoteric mystical traditions of Asia, notably Indian subcontinent. The word Abhyasi means "one who practises" in Sanskrit.

Titles and occupations in Hinduism